Stranraer Academy is a secondary school in Stranraer in south west Scotland. It serves the area of Stranraer, the Rhins, and parts of the Machars.

The original Stranraer Academy was opened in 1845 on the site of the present Stranraer Campus of Dumfries & Galloway College. In 1965 a new Academy (B Block) was built alongside a new High School (A Block), and in 1970 the schools joined together.

Recent history
The Academy is a six-year comprehensive school, with a school roll above 1000, and is the second-most attended secondary school in Dumfries and Galloway. Nearly 100 full- and part-time teachers work at the academy, and are aided by a team of support staff.

In May 2006, the school's rector. Jimmy Higgins announced his retirement following an unfavorable HMIe report in January 2006 and left the following August. After his retirement, Joanna Pallet became Acting Head Teacher until a replacement (Norman Dawson) could be found.

The school received a follow-up report from HMIe January 2008. The inspectorate stated that there have been "significant improvements", particularly in terms of the overall quality of learning and teaching and that there had also been some improvements in pupils' attainment, relative to schools with similar characteristics. They also stated that more now remained to be done to rebuild the school's reputation in the community, improve attainment levels, address staffing difficulties and deal with outstanding health and safety issues.

Buildings

Up to the mid-1990s the school consisted of three buildings built in the 1960s and 70s. At this time Dumfries & Galloway Council drew up plans to rebuild the entire school by 2000. Phase 1 was opened in 1997. In February 2000 A Block was vacated and classes moved into newly refurbished areas in B and C Block, creating a more compact campus. Due to funding problems (particular with [PPP] projects) Phase 2 was continually delayed by the council, along with the demolition of 'A' Block, which lay empty and derelict for five years. After campaigning by the local newspaper, school, school board, and student council, demolition work on 'A' Block finally begun in 2005, being completed in January 2006.

As part of Dumfries and Galloway's £100 million public private partnership (PPP) project to build nine new schools within Dumfries and Galloway (e4d&g), the new school was completed in early 2010.

Delays in completion of Phase 2 of the Academy has led to a deterioration in the building quality of the 1997 New Building, and thus as part of the e4d&g project this building is to be fully refurbished.

Notable former pupils

Jamie Adams, Footballer - St. Johnstone FC
Richard Arkless, SNP Former Member of Parliament for Dumfries and Galloway
Colin Calderwood, Scotland Football International
Craig Hamilton, Scotland Rugby International - Edinburgh Rugby
Emma Harper, SNP Member of the Scottish Parliament for South of Scotland
Allan Jenkins, Footballer - Greenock Morton
Kevin Kyle, Scottish Football International - Professional Footballer
Bobby Lammie, Olympic curler
Allan Little, BBC Foreign Correspondent
Rory Loy, Footballer 
David Speirs MP, Australian Politician 
Dame Leslie Strathie, Former Chief Executive of HM Revenue and Customs
Fred Urquhart (writer)

Gallery

References

External links

Stranraer Academy's page on Scottish Schools Online
Dumfries and Galloway Council, School Services; Stranraer Academy Information Page
MiniWeb: Schools PPP - Stranraer Academy

Educational institutions established in 1845
Secondary schools in Dumfries and Galloway
Stranraer
1845 establishments in Scotland